Liu Sijia (born July 20, 1988) is a Chinese curler from Harbin.

Career
As a junior curler Liu won a gold medal at the 2010 Pacific Junior Curling Championships and silvers at the 2008 and 2009 Pacific Juniors. She skipped the Chinese team to a seventh place finish at the 2010 World Junior Curling Championships, finishing with a 3–6 record.

In her first season out of juniors, Liu was the lead for the Chinese team, skipped by Wang Bingyu at the 2010 Pacific Curling Championships, winning a silver medal. Four years later, Liu skipped China at the 2014 World Women's Curling Championship, finishing seventh with a 6–5 record. The following year she also skipped the Chinese team at the 2015 World Women's Curling Championship, where they lost in a tiebreaker to Scotland's Eve Muirhead.

Liu won her first World Curling Tour event at the 2014 Cloverdale Cash Spiel.

References

External links

1988 births
Living people
Chinese female curlers
Sportspeople from Harbin
Pacific-Asian curling champions